The Western Raider was an American pulp magazine.  The first issue was dated August/September 1938; it was followed by two more issues under that title, publishing Western fiction, and then was changed to a crime fiction pulp for two issues, titled The Octopus and The Scorpion.  Both these two issues were named after a supervillain, rather than after a hero who fights crime, as was the case with most such magazines.  Norvell Page wrote the lead novels for both the crime fiction issues; the second was rewritten by Ejler Jakobsson, one of the editors, to change the character from The Octopus to The Scorpion.

Bibliographic details 
The Western Raider was published by Popular Publications.  There were a total of five issues; three under the title The Western Raider, one as The Octopus, and one as The Scorpion.  There was one volume of four numbers; with the final issue the numbering was restarted at volume 1 number 1.  It was in pulp format, with 128 pages, priced at 15 cents for the three Western issues; the last two issues were 112 pages and 10 cents.  The schedule was bimonthly, starting with August/September 1938 and ending with April/May 1939.  The co-editors for the two crime fiction issues were Ejler Jakobsson and Edith Jakobsson.

References

Sources 

 
 
 

Magazines established in 1938
Magazines disestablished in 1939
Magazines published in New York City